Sam Hazewinkel (born March 4, 1983) of Norman, Oklahoma is an American wrestler who won the 2012 U.S. Olympic Trials and competed at the 2012 Olympics in freestyle (55 kg) division. Hazewinkel previously served as head wrestling coach at Oklahoma City University during the 2019 and 2020 seasons. He has since returned to the University of Oklahoma, where he is a Volunteer Assistant Coach with his alma mater.

High school
Hazewinkel completed a 140-0 record while wrestling in high school at Pensacola Christian Academy in Pensacola, Florida. He was a three-time Florida state champion. Hazewinkel was also a two-time Junior National Greco-Roman Champion.

College
In college, Hazewinkel was a four-time All-American at the University of Oklahoma, with a best finish of 2nd place at the NCAA Championships.

International
Hazewinkel was a 2008 University World Champion in Greco-Roman, as well as a World Team and World Cup team member for the USA.

Sam defeated wrestler Nick Simmons 2 to 1 at the finals of the 2012 U.S. Olympic Trials, with a final and deciding period victory of 3-0.

At the 2012 Olympics, Sam lost to in his opening match to Daulet Niyazbekov of Kazakhstan.

Family
Sam's father Dave Hazewinkel and uncle Jim Hazewinkel were Olympic wrestlers.

References 

Living people
1983 births
Sportspeople from Norman, Oklahoma
American male sport wrestlers
Olympic wrestlers of the United States
Wrestlers at the 2012 Summer Olympics